Bao Wenyue (1892–1980) was a Chinese warlord and military officer who was the Minister of Military Affairs in the Reorganized National Government of China under Wang Jingwei, during the Second Sino-Japanese War.

Biography 
He was born in the Liaoning Province in 1892, during the reign of the Guangxu Emperor. Bao was a graduate of the Peking military institute. From 1931 to 1939 Bao was a member of the Military Affairs Commission of the Republic of China. In 1939, he surrendered to the Japanese and was declared a traitor by the Nationalist government. In 1940 he was promoted to general by the collaborationist government under Wang Jingwei in Nanjing and was made the war minister. After the capitulation of Japan in 1945, he was arrested by the Nationalists and sentenced to death the following year. However, the sentence was never carried out and he was instead sent to Taiwan, where he lived in prison until his release in 1975. Bao died in 1980.

Sources 

1892 births
1980 deaths
Chinese collaborators with Imperial Japan
Kuomintang collaborators with Imperial Japan
Republic of China warlords from Liaoning
Politicians from Dandong
Taiwanese people from Liaoning
People convicted of treason